Idiagonum is a genus of ground beetles in the family Carabidae. There are about 16 described species in Idiagonum.

Species
These 16 species belong to the genus Idiagonum:

 Idiagonum asperius Darlington, 1952  (New Guinea)
 Idiagonum asperum Darlington, 1952  (New Guinea)
 Idiagonum capellae Baehr, 2012  (Indonesia, New Guinea, and Papua)
 Idiagonum darlingtoni Baehr, 2000  (Indonesia and New Guinea)
 Idiagonum eliti Baehr, 2000  (Indonesia and New Guinea)
 Idiagonum giluwe Darlington, 1971  (New Guinea)
 Idiagonum inasperum Darlington, 1952  (Indonesia and New Guinea)
 Idiagonum latius Baehr, 2000  (Indonesia and New Guinea)
 Idiagonum limatulum Darlington, 1971  (New Guinea)
 Idiagonum longipenne Baehr, 2000  (Indonesia and New Guinea)
 Idiagonum macrocephalum Baehr, 2000  (New Guinea)
 Idiagonum muscorum Darlington, 1952  (Indonesia and New Guinea)
 Idiagonum opacicolle Baehr, 2000  (Indonesia and New Guinea)
 Idiagonum riedeli Baehr, 2000  (Indonesia and New Guinea)
 Idiagonum sinuatipenne Baehr, 2000  (Indonesia and New Guinea)
 Idiagonum wapenamandae Baehr, 2000  (New Guinea)

References

Platyninae